Denis Fuatovich Shafikov (born 3 June 1985) is a Russian professional boxer. He held the European super-lightweight title from 2011 to 2013, and has challenged three times for the IBF lightweight title. In November 2017, Shafikov was ranked within the world's top ten active lightweights by The Ring magazine, the Transnational Boxing Rankings Board, and BoxRec.

Early life and amateur career
Born into a Bashkir family, Shafikov did not immediately take a liking to boxing when trying out different sports in childhood. He nonetheless began his amateur boxing career at 13 years old, in which he had "about 90 amateur fights and lost only 6 of them." His decision to turn professional was based on wanting to earn money for his family, rather than medals.

Professional career
Shafikov has been trained by Abel Sanchez since 2015. He made his professional debut on 30 November 2003, winning a four-round unanimous decision over Pavel Lyakhov, who also debuted. For the next eleven years, Shafikov would remain undefeated while fighting mainly in Finland, having moved there in 2007. On 29 October 2010, he fought to a majority draw against Brunet Zamora, with the regional WBA Inter-Continental light-welterweight title on the line. A year later, on 23 September 2011, Shafikov won his first major regional championship—the European light-welterweight title—by forcing veteran contender Giuseppe Lauri to retire in his corner. Two successful defences of the title were made in 2012: the first was against Lee McAllister on 25 February, which ended in an eighth-round corner retirement. The second was a rematch with Zamora on 31 May, which Shafikov won via unanimous decision.

Shafikov vs. Vasquez 
On 22 February 2014, Shafikov travelled to Macau to face IBF lightweight champion Miguel Vázquez. In what was described as a "lightweight title fight that completely sucked the air out of [the] venue" due to "clinching, headbutts and lots of other matters that don't quite reflect actual fighting", Vázquez went on to hand Shafikov his first professional loss in a lacklustre unanimous decision.

Shafikov vs. Barthelemy 
The following year, on 18 December, Shafikov received another opportunity to fight for the vacant IBF lightweight title, this time against Rances Barthelemy, but lost again via unanimous decision.

Shafikov vs. Herring 
Shafikov returned on 2 July 2016 in emphatic style, beating down and stopping undefeated lightweight prospect Jamel Herring in the tenth and final round.

Shafikov vs. Easter Jr 
On 30 June 2017, in his third world title challenge, Shafikov lost a competitive unanimous decision against IBF lightweight champion Robert Easter Jr., in a hard-hitting slugfest. The scorecards read 120-108, 120-108 and 116-112 in favour of Easter Jr.

Shafikov vs. Alvarado 
In his next bout, Shafikov faced Rene Alvarado, who was ranked #10 by the WBA at super featherweight. Shafikov lost the fight via split decision.

Personal life
Despite his nickname of "Genghis Khan", Shafikov is of Bashkir rather than Mongol ethnicity. The nickname was given to him by his Finnish promoter Pekka Mäki, with Shafikov saying that he wants to "conquer the world as Genghis Khan did." His favourite boxers include Mike Tyson and Manny Pacquiao.

Professional boxing record

References

External links

 at Top Rank (archived)
Denis Shafikov - Profile, News Archive & Current Rankings at Box.Live

Russian male boxers
Lightweight boxers
Light-welterweight boxers
1985 births
People from Miass
Living people
European Boxing Union champions
Bashkir people
Russian expatriates in Finland
Russian expatriates in the United States
Super-featherweight boxers
Sportspeople from Chelyabinsk Oblast